Interpro Cycling Academy is a Japanese UCI Continental cycling team founded in 2017.

By the end of 2019 season, the team was merged to Hincapie–Leomo p/b BMC.

Major results
2018
Stage 4 Tour du Maroc, Alexey Vermeulen
2019
Stage 2 Tour de Tochigi, Maris Bogdanovics
Stage 7 Tour of Japan, Pablo Torres
Stage 4 Tour of Qinghai Lake, Hernán Aguirre
 Overall Tour Cycliste International de la Guadeloupe, Adrien Guillonnet
Stage 6, Adrien Guillonnet

Team roster

References

UCI Continental Teams (Asia)
Cycling teams based in Japan
Cycling teams established in 2017